The Fish Lake physa, scientific name Physella microstriata, was a species of air-breathing freshwater snail, an aquatic gastropod mollusk in the family Physidae.

This species was endemic to the United States. It is now extinct.

References

Physidae
Extinct gastropods
Endemic fauna of the United States
Gastropods described in 1930
Taxonomy articles created by Polbot